Trichodezia albovittata, the white-striped black moth, is a moth in the family Geometridae. It is found from Alaska to Newfoundland and Labrador, south in the east to North Carolina and in the west to northern California.

The wingspan is 20–25 mm. The wings are black with a white bar across forewing, narrowing and meeting the terminal white wedge near the inner margin. The hindwings have black fringes, although they are white towards the outer angle. Adults are on wing from April to September.

The larvae feed on Impatiens species.

Subspecies
Trichodezia albovittata albovittata
Trichodezia albovittata tenuifasciata Barnes & McDunnough, 1917

References

Moths described in 1857
Cidariini